Underwood Dudley (born January 6, 1937) is an American mathematician. His popular works include several books describing crank mathematics by pseudomathematicians who incorrectly believe they have squared the circle or done other impossible things.

Career
Dudley was born in New York City.  He received bachelor's and master's degrees from the Carnegie Institute of Technology and a PhD from the University of Michigan.  His academic career consisted of two years at Ohio State University followed by 37 at DePauw University, from which he retired in 2004.  He edited the College Mathematics Journal and the Pi Mu Epsilon Journal, and was a Pólya Lecturer for the Mathematical Association of America (MAA) for two years. He is the discoverer of the Dudley triangle.

Publications
Dudley's popular books include Mathematical Cranks (MAA 1992), The Trisectors (MAA 1996), and Numerology: Or, What Pythagoras Wrought (MAA 1997). Dudley won the Trevor Evans Award for expository writing from the MAA in 1996.

Dudley has also written and edited straightforward mathematical works such as Readings for Calculus (MAA 1993) and Elementary Number Theory (W.H. Freeman 1978). In 2009, he authored "A Guide to Elementary Number Theory" (MAA, 2009), published under Mathematical Association of America's Dolciani Mathematical Expositions.

Lawsuit 
In 1995, Dudley was one of several people sued by William Dilworth for defamation because Mathematical Cranks included an analysis of Dilworth's "A correction in set theory", an attempted refutation of Cantor's diagonal method. The suit was dismissed in 1996 due to failure to state a claim.

The dismissal was upheld on appeal in a decision written by jurist Richard Posner. From the decision:  "A crank is a person inexplicably obsessed by an obviously unsound idea—a person with a bee in his bonnet. To call a person a crank is to say that because of some quirk of temperament he is wasting his time pursuing a line of thought that is plainly without merit or promise ... To call a person a crank is basically just a colorful and insulting way of expressing disagreement with his master idea, and it therefore belongs to the language of controversy rather than to the language of defamation."

See also 
 Pseudomathematics

References

External links

 
 
 DePauw University News story on Underwood Dudley and his "crank file"" (with photo)
 Review of Hans Walser's The Golden Section by Underwood Dudley

1937 births
Living people
20th-century American mathematicians
21st-century American mathematicians
American folklorists
Carnegie Mellon University alumni
University of Michigan alumni
DePauw University faculty
Ohio State University faculty
Pseudomathematics